Daniel Gevargiznejad (8 April 1940 – 27  March 2020) was an Iranian weightlifter. He won the silver medal at the 1970 Asian Games, He also participated at the 1968 Summer Olympics.

References

External links
 

1940 births
2020 deaths
People from Urmia
Iranian Assyrian people
Iranian male weightlifters
Olympic weightlifters of Iran
Weightlifters at the 1968 Summer Olympics
Medalists at the 1970 Asian Games
Asian Games silver medalists for Iran
Weightlifters at the 1970 Asian Games
Asian Games medalists in weightlifting
20th-century Iranian people
21st-century Iranian people